St. George—St. David was a provincial electoral district in Ontario, Canada that existed between 1987 and 1999 that returned Members of Provincial Parliament (MPPs) to the Legislative Assembly of Ontario at Queen's Park.

The riding was created before the 1987 election when the former electoral districts of St. George and St. David were merged.

It was named after St. George's and St. David's wards, which had been historical names for two wards in the City of Toronto.

The riding was abolished for the 1999 provincial election.

Members of Provincial Parliament

Election results

References

Notes

Citations

Former provincial electoral districts of Ontario
Provincial electoral districts of Toronto